Polideini is a tribe of bristle flies in the family Tachinidae. There are about 16 genera and at least 40 described species in Polideini.

Genera
 Chlorohystricia Townsend, 1927
 Chromatocera Townsend, 1915
 Chrysotachina Brauer & Bergenstamm, 1889
 Dichocera Williston, 1895
 Euscopolia Townsend, 1892
 Exoristoides Coquillett, 1897
 Homalactia Townsend, 1915
 Hystricia Macquart, 1844
 Lydina Robineau-Desvoidy, 1830
 Lypha Robineau-Desvoidy, 1830
 Mactomyia Reinhard, 1958
 Mauromyia Coquillett, 1897
 Micronychia Brauer and Bergenstamm, 1889
 Nigrilypha O'Hara, 2002
 Ostracophyto Townsend, 1915
 Spilochaetosoma Smith, 1917

References

Further reading

External links

 
 

Tachininae